Clostridium autoethanogenum is an anaerobic bacterium that produces ethanol from carbon monoxide, in so-called syngas fermentation, being one of the few known microorganisms to do so. It is gram-positive, spore-forming, rod-like, motile, and was first isolated from rabbit feces. Its type strain is strain JA1-1. Its genome has been sequenced  and the genes required for utilising carbon monoxide as a sole carbon and energy source have been determined.

Uses
This species is the key to the technology developed by Lanzatech to create ethanol from waste carbon monoxide gas of factory emissions.

References

Further reading
   *

External links
 
 LPSN

Gram-positive bacteria
autoethanogenum